The Aleemiyah Institute of Islamic Studies (or Islamic Center) is a university of Islamic & Modern Sciences located in Karachi, Sindh, Pakistan. The institution is run by the World Federation of Islamic Missions.

History 
The Aleemiyah Institute of Islamic Studies was established in July 1964 by Dr. Muhammad Fazlur Rahman al-Ansari al-Qadri, the Founder President of the World Federation of Islamic Missions. Trinidadian Islamic scholar Imran Nazar Hosein completed his studies at the institute.

See also 
Islam in Pakistan
Sufi Saints of South Asia
Muhammad Abdul Aleem Siddiqi
University of Karachi

References

External links 
Official Website

Universities and colleges in Karachi
Islamic universities and colleges in Pakistan
Barelvi Islamic universities and colleges